Turquoise Pool is a hot spring in the Midway Geyser Basin of Yellowstone National Park, Wyoming.

See also
Geothermal areas of Yellowstone
Hayden Geological Survey of 1871
List of Yellowstone geothermal features
Yellowstone National Park

References

Geysers of Wyoming
Geothermal features of Teton County, Wyoming
Geothermal features of Yellowstone National Park
Geysers of Teton County, Wyoming